West Bromwich West is a constituency represented in the House of Commons of the UK Parliament since 2019 by Shaun Bailey, a member of the Conservative Party.

Members of Parliament

Constituency profile
Wednesbury and Tipton are economic centres and historic towns with considerable suburbs, although overshadowed in the service sector by nearby Birmingham. Since the recessions of the 1970s and early 1980s, West Bromwich West has suffered from an acute, stubbornly great minority of unemployment, and as a result of the Great Recession of 2008, unemployment peaked at 14.3%. Only Birmingham, Ladywood nearby had higher unemployment rates in all of Britain.

Workless claimants who were registered jobseekers were, in November 2012, higher than the national average of 3.8%, standing at 8.1% of the local population. Based on a statistical compilation by The Guardian, this also exceeded the regional average of 4.7% of those of working age in receipt of this benefit, which is seen as the lower gauge of the breadth of unemployment.

Boundaries

West Bromwich West is one of four constituencies covering the Metropolitan Borough of Sandwell, covering its west and north-west. Its main settlements are the towns of Tipton and Wednesbury, alongside the villages or suburbs of Great Bridge, Princes End and Tividale.

1997–present: The Metropolitan Borough of Sandwell wards of Great Bridge, Oldbury, Princes End, Tipton Green, Tividale, Wednesbury North, and Wednesbury South.

1983–1997: The Metropolitan Borough of Sandwell wards of Great Bridge, Greets Green and Lyng, Princes End, Tipton Green, Wednesbury North, and Wednesbury South.

1974–1983: The County Borough of West Bromwich wards of Greets Green, Hill Top, Horseley Heath, Lyng, Market, Tibbington, Tipton Green, and Wood Green.

History
The constituency was created in 1974 and took its present boundaries (except for partial ward shares with West Bromwich East) in 1997.

Political history
The seat was held by either the Labour Party or one of its members as the Speaker of the House of Commons from its creation until December 2019.

From 1974 until 2000, this was the constituency of Betty Boothroyd, who was first elected for the former West Bromwich in its by-election in 1973 and became the first woman to be Speaker of the House of Commons in 1992. She retired as Speaker in 2000. The ensuing by-election was won by the Labour Co-operative candidate Adrian Bailey, who held the seat until 2019. Shaun Bailey, the Conservative Party candidate in the 2019 general election, took the seat from Labour with a 50.5% vote share on an 11.7% swing. He became the first-ever Conservative member for the constituency.

At local level, Labour hold most of the wards of the constituency. From 2008 until 2012, they were followed by the controversial British National Party, who had four councillors, ahead of the Conservatives with three. This came after a fairly strong BNP showing in the 2005 general election, when they received nearly 10% of the vote.

Elections

Elections in the 2010s

Elections in the 2000s

Elections in the 1990s

1Boothroyd stood as "The Speaker seeking re-election."

Elections in the 1980s

Elections in the 1970s

See also
 List of parliamentary constituencies in the West Midlands (county)

Notes

References

Politics of Sandwell
Parliamentary constituencies in the West Midlands (county)
Constituencies of the Parliament of the United Kingdom established in 1974
West Bromwich